Péter Biros (born 5 April 1976) is a Hungarian former water polo player, who played on the gold medal squads at the 2000 Summer Olympics, 2004 Summer Olympics and 2008 Summer Olympics, which makes him one of six male athletes who won three Olympic gold medals in water polo. ( Kiss Szecsi Molnar Kasas Benedek Biros)  He also competed at the 2012 Summer Olympics.

He is nicknamed Fácán, meaning 'pheasant', and made his debut for the national side in 1997, during an international tournament in Seville, Spain.

After the 2008 Olympics final, Biros revealed that he performed the entire tournament with a cyst by his heart, something that was unknown to the entire team and coaches alike. He insisted that he played with the consent of his doctors, and received a Fair Play award afterwards for it. He was given the honour to carry the national flag of Hungary at the opening ceremony of the 2012 Summer Olympics in London, becoming the 23rd water polo player to be a flag bearer at the opening and closing ceremonies of the Olympics.

Honours

National
 Olympic Games:  Gold medal - 2000, 2004, 2008
 World Championships:  Gold medal - 2003;  Silver medal - 2005, 2007
 European Championship:  Gold medal - 1999;  Silver medal - 2006;  Bronze medal - 2001, 2003, 2008, 2012
 FINA World League:  Gold medal - 2003, 2004;  Silver medal - 2005, 2007;  Bronze medal - 2002
 FINA World Cup:  Gold medal - 1999;  Silver medal - 2006, 2006

Club
 Euroleague Winners (1): (2004 - with Bp. Honvéd)
 LEN Cup Winners (1): (1999 - with UTE)
 LEN Super Cup Winner (1): (2004 - with Bp. Honvéd)

 Hungarian Championship (OB I): 8x (2002, 2003, 2004, 2005, 2006 - with Bp. Honvéd; 2011, 2013, 2014 - with Eger)
 Hungarian Cup (Magyar Kupa): 4x (2006 - with Bp. Honvéd; 2007, 2008, 2015 - with Eger)
 Hungarian SuperCup (Szuperkupa): 1x (2005 - with Bp. Honvéd)
 Yugoslavian Championship: 1x (2001 - with Bečej)
 Yugoslavian Cup: 1x (2001 - with Bečej)

Individual
 OB I top scorer (Hungarian Championship): 2001–02
 Prva HVL top scorer (Croatia Championship): 1999–2000

Awards
 Member of the Hungarian team of year: 1999, 2000, 2003, 2004, 2008
 Hungarian Water Polo Player of the Year: 2001, 2003, 2005, 2008, 2011
 Honorary Citizen of Eger (2008)
 Honorary Citizen of Budapest (2008)
 Best European player of year (LEN): 2008
 Best Water Polo Player of the Year (Swimming World): 2009
 UNESCO Fair Play Award (2009)
 Ministerial Certificate of Merit (2012)
 Member of International Swimming Hall of Fame (2015)

Orders
   Officer's Cross of the Order of Merit of the Republic of Hungary (2000)
   Commander's Cross of the Order of Merit of the Republic of Hungary (2004)
   Commander's Cross of the Order of Merit of the Republic of Hungary with the Star (2008)

See also
 Hungary men's Olympic water polo team records and statistics
 List of multiple Olympic gold medalists in one event
 List of Olympic champions in men's water polo
 List of Olympic medalists in water polo (men)
 List of players who have appeared in multiple men's Olympic water polo tournaments
 List of men's Olympic water polo tournament top goalscorers
 List of flag bearers for Hungary at the Olympics
 List of world champions in men's water polo
 List of World Aquatics Championships medalists in water polo
 List of members of the International Swimming Hall of Fame

References

External links

 

1976 births
Living people
Sportspeople from Miskolc
Hungarian male water polo players
Water polo drivers
Water polo players at the 2000 Summer Olympics
Water polo players at the 2004 Summer Olympics
Water polo players at the 2008 Summer Olympics
Water polo players at the 2012 Summer Olympics
Medalists at the 2000 Summer Olympics
Medalists at the 2004 Summer Olympics
Medalists at the 2008 Summer Olympics
Olympic gold medalists for Hungary in water polo
World Aquatics Championships medalists in water polo
Hungarian water polo coaches